Jacomina "Mien" Elisabeth Sophia van den Berg (28 December 1909 - 14 November 1996) was a Dutch gymnast who competed in the 1928 Summer Olympics, earning a gold medal.

She was born in and died in The Hague.

References

1909 births
1996 deaths
Dutch female artistic gymnasts
Olympic gymnasts of the Netherlands
Gymnasts at the 1928 Summer Olympics
Olympic gold medalists for the Netherlands
Gymnasts from The Hague
Olympic medalists in gymnastics
Medalists at the 1928 Summer Olympics
20th-century Dutch women
20th-century Dutch people